Theodore Addison Wegert (April 17, 1932 – February 18, 1986) was an American football running back in the National Football League for the Philadelphia Eagles and Pittsburgh Steelers.  He also played in the American Football League for the Buffalo Bills, Denver Broncos, and the New York Titans.  Wegert did not attend college.

See also
Other American Football League players

References

1932 births
1986 deaths
American football running backs
Buffalo Bills players
Denver Broncos (AFL) players
New York Titans (AFL) players
People from Riverhead (town), New York
Philadelphia Eagles players
Pittsburgh Steelers players
Players of American football from New York (state)
Sportspeople from Suffolk County, New York
American Football League players